Hasnul bin Baharuddin is a Malaysian politician and currently serves as Deputy Speaker of the Selangor State Legislative Assembly.

Election results

References 

Living people
People from Selangor
Malaysian people of Malay descent
 National Trust Party (Malaysia) politicians
21st-century Malaysian politicians
Year of birth missing (living people)
Members of the Selangor State Legislative Assembly